Maurice Anthony Chambers (born 14 September 1987) is a cricketer who represented Essex and Northamptonshire between 2005 and 2015. He played as a right-handed batsman and a right-arm fast bowler. Despite being born at Port Antonio in Jamaica, Chambers qualified as a domestic player in county cricket by residence.

Chambers made his debut first-class appearance for Essex in June 2005 and played 44 first-class matches for the county. During this period he was selected to tour the West Indies with England Lions, and played two matches before he returned home injured.

In 2013 he spent a brief spell on loan to Warwickshire, before signing for Northants. He played 14 first-class matches for Northants, but his contract was not renewed at the end of the 2015 season.

During the 2016 season, Chambers played in the Yorkshire South Premier League for Aston Hall.

In 2021, in the wake of revelations made by Azeem Rafiq and others about their treatment in County Cricket, Chambers revealed he had been subject to repeated racist abuse during his time at Essex.

References

External links

1987 births
Living people
Jamaican cricketers
Jamaican emigrants to the United Kingdom
English cricketers
Essex cricketers
Warwickshire cricketers
Northamptonshire cricketers
People from Port Antonio